The 1961 Worcester by-election was a by-election held for the British House of Commons constituency of Worcester on 16 March 1961. It was won by the Conservative Party candidate Peter Walker.

Candidates
The local Liberals selected 40-year-old journalist Robert Glenton as their candidate. He was an international rally driver, and a motoring correspondent for the Sunday Express. Born in June 1920 and educated at Scarborough College, he had previously stood as Liberal candidate for Hitchin at the 1959 general election.

See also
Worcester (UK Parliament constituency)
Worcester
List of United Kingdom by-elections

References

Worcester by-election
Politics of Worcester, England
By-elections to the Parliament of the United Kingdom in Worcestershire constituencies
Worcester by-election
Worcester by-election
20th century in Worcestershire